= Wayside stop =

Wayside stop may refer to:

- Rest area, a designated location alongside a road or highway where motorists can stop and rest
- Railway stop, a small intermediate station on a railway with a platform, but minimal facilities
